Amir ibn Muslim al-Abdi (Arabic: عامِر بن مُسلِم العَبدی) was a companions of Hussain ibn Ali and was martyred in the Battle of Karbala. His name was included among those who were martyred in the first raid.

Lineage 
Amir was son of Muslim from the families of Abd al-Qays. According to Mamaqani, Muslim was martyred in the army of Ali ibn Abi Talib in the Battle of Siffin.

On the day of Ashura 
Amir was from Basra who joined Hussain ibn Ali in Mecca together with his servant Salim. On the Day of Ashura, he was martyred in the first attack. His name has been mentioned in the Ziarat al-Shuhada and Ziarat Rajabiyya.

References 

Husayn ibn Ali
Hussainiya
People killed at the Battle of Karbala